The 2016–17 season was third consecutive season in the top Ukrainian football league for Olimpik Donetsk. Olimpik competed in Premier League and in the Ukrainian Cup. Finishing 4th in Premiek League Olimpik qualified to Europa League third qualifying round for next season which would be the first participation in European club competition in club history.

Players

Squad information

Transfers

In

Out

Pre-season and friendlies

Competitions

Overall

Premier League

League table

Results summary

Results by round

Matches

Ukrainian Cup

Statistics

Appearances and goals

|-
! colspan=14 style=background:#dcdcdc; text-align:center| Goalkeepers

|-
! colspan=14 style=background:#dcdcdc; text-align:center| Defenders

|-
! colspan=14 style=background:#dcdcdc; text-align:center| Midfielders 

|-
! colspan=14 style=background:#dcdcdc; text-align:center| Forwards

|-
! colspan=14 style=background:#dcdcdc; text-align:center| Players transferred out during the season

Last updated: 31 May 2017

Goalscorers

Last updated: 21 May 2017

Clean sheets

Last updated: 26 May 2017

Disciplinary record

Last updated: 31 May 2017

References

External links 
 Official website 

FC Olimpik Donetsk
Olimpik Donetsk